Terry "Olney" Kent III (born August 8, 1962) is an American sprint canoer who competed from the mid-1980s to the early 1990s. He won a silver medal in the K-2 500 m event at the 1990 ICF Canoe Sprint World Championships in Poznań.

Kent also competed in three Summer Olympics, earning his best finish of fourth in the K-2 1000 m event at Los Angeles in 1984.

A native of Lake Placid, New York, Kent served as a venue announcer at The Whistler Sliding Centre for the 2010 Winter Olympics in Vancouver in the bobsleigh, luge, and skeleton events. He had also served as a venue announcer for the 2002 Winter Olympics, 2004 Summer Olympics, and 2008 Summer Olympics.

Terry has two children, the eldest being Halle Kent (born July 18, 1994) and the youngest Cassandra Kent (born June 21, 1996).

References

Sports-reference.com profile
Vancouver2010.com 9 December 2009 article on media production teams at respective venues for the 2010 Winter Olympics. - accessed 9 December 2009.

1962 births
American male canoeists
Canoeists at the 1984 Summer Olympics
Canoeists at the 1988 Summer Olympics
Canoeists at the 1992 Summer Olympics
Living people
Olympic canoeists of the United States
ICF Canoe Sprint World Championships medalists in kayak
Cornell University alumni